François-Virgile Dubillard (16 February 1845 in Soye near Besançon. France – 1 December 1914 in Chambéry) was a cardinal of the Catholic Church, and Archbishop of Chambéry 1907–1914. 

He was made cardinal in 1911 by Pope Pius X. He was too ill to take part in the 1914 conclave.

References

20th-century French cardinals
Archbishops of Chambéry
Bishops of Quimper
19th-century French Roman Catholic priests
1845 births
1914 deaths
Cardinals created by Pope Pius X